This is a list of career statistics of Swedish professional tennis player Johanna Larsson since her professional debut in 2006. Larsson has won two WTA singles and 14 doubles titles, including both titles at her home tournament in Båstad in 2015.

Performance timelines

Only main-draw results in WTA Tour, Grand Slam tournaments, Fed Cup and Olympic Games are included in win–loss records.

Singles

Doubles

Significant finals

WTA Finals

Doubles: 1 (runner-up)

WTA Tour career finals

Singles: 5 (2 titles, 3 runner-ups)

Doubles: 23 (14 titles, 9 runner-ups)

ITF Circuit finals

Singles: 25 (13 titles, 12 runner-ups)

Doubles: 26 (17 titles, 9 runner-ups)

Wins over top 10 players

Notes

External links
 
 
 Johanna Larsson's CoreTennis Profile

Larsson, Johanna